Norman Yengeni is a retired South African Army officer who served as Chief of Human Resources.

He served as Chief Director Human Resource Management from 2012 to 2014 before being promoted to Chief of Human Resources. He retired in 2019.

References

Living people
South African Army generals
Year of birth missing (living people)